KRDY (1160 AM) is a radio station in San Antonio, Texas. The station is owned by Relevant Radio, Inc. and is an affiliate of its Catholic talk network. The transmitter is off Braun Road, near Loop 1604, in San Antonio.

History

KBER: 1961-1978
On November 13, 1961, the station signed on as KBER, a daytime only station on 1150 kHz.  It was owned by Kepo Broadcasting.  KBER was powered at 1,000 watts using a three tower directional antenna (DA) system. The DA was needed to protect co-channel stations KZNE in College Station, and KCCT in Corpus Christi. As KBER was west of KZNE and north of KCCT, the system directed to the northwest and reduced signal across an arc toward the KZNE and KCCT service areas.

Towers and studios were on Alma Drive just outside the future Loop 410. The area would later be dubbed "KBER Square."  On June 25, 1966, KBER-FM signed on at 100.3 FM.  The two stations simulcasted their programming; because KBER was off the air at night, KBER-FM allowed programming to be heard around the clock.  KBER-FM was later KSAQ; under different owners, the station is now KCYY.

KFHM: 1978‒1991
On May 31, 1978, KFHM began broadcasting as a Tejano/Latin music AM radio station.  The station changed to 1160 kHz in the mid 1980s, giving it increased coverage and full time authorization. Power was boosted to 10,000 watts by day and 1,000 watts by night from a site west of San Antonio.

KVAR: 1991‒1993
On August 26, 1991, the station changed its call sign from KFHM to KVAR.

KENS: 1993‒2004
On October 15, 1993, the station changed its call letters from KVAR to KENS and adopted a news/talk radio format.

In March 2003, KENS was sold to ABC Radio Networks for $3.2 million and flipped to Radio Disney on April 1, 2003.

KRDY: 2004‒present
On February 27, 2004, the station changed its call letters from KENS to KRDY.

On June 4, 2013, Radio Disney announced that it would be selling seven radio stations, including KRDY, in an attempt to increase revenue and focus more on stations serving Top 25 markets.

On September 28, 2013, KRDY dropped the Radio Disney affiliation and went silent.

In October 2013, Radio Disney Group filed to sell KRDY and KDIS-FM in Little Rock to Salem Communications Corporation, owner of several other San Antonio-area radio stations. Salem's purchase, at a price of $2 million, was consummated on February 7, 2014.

In February 2018, KRDY changed its format from Spanish Christian radio to conservative talk, branded as "Freedom 1160".

In November 2019, the station was sold to Immaculate Heart Media, Inc. and it became an affiliate of Relevant Radio.

References

External links

RDY
Radio stations established in 1961
Relevant Radio stations
1961 establishments in Texas
Former subsidiaries of The Walt Disney Company
RDY